Leo Earl Sharp Sr. (May 7, 1924 – December 12, 2016), also known as El Tata, was an American World War II veteran, horticulturist, and drug courier for a branch of the Sinaloa Cartel.

Drug Enforcement Administration Special Agent Jeff Moore arrested Sharp in 2011 and was interviewed by The New York Times writer Sam Dolnick regarding the investigation into the world's oldest drug mule.

Early life  
Sharp was born in Michigan City, Indiana, and was raised in the city of Detroit, Michigan.

Military service and honors
Sharp fought in the Italian Campaign in World War II and received a Bronze Star Medal for his service.

Horticulturist career 
Sharp claimed to have been an owner of a small airline company that eventually went bankrupt. Sharp later became a horticulturist and florist known for hybridizing popular new breeds of flowers, specifically the daylily. Sharp became world renowned for his hybridizing of popular new breeds of his flowers.

Sharp gained popularity for producing relatively small flowers with vibrant colors. His most popular creation was the Ojo Poco, a  apricot-colored flower with a red bull’s-eye at the center that he introduced in 1994. "Anyone who has over 100 daylilies in their garden would recognize it by sight," Kevin P. Walek, a former president of the American Hemerocallis Society said. The daylily Hemerocallis 'Siloam Leo Sharp' is named after him.

Daylily enthusiasts visited Sharp’s flower farm near Michigan City, Indiana where he lived for decades. Sharp’s neighbors in Michigan City recalled buses filled with customers outside his front gate waiting to buy his signature flowers, almost all named after his business, Brookwood Gardens.

Sharp traveled across the country for daily speaking engagements and conventions, and boasted at the time of his arrest that he had once been invited to the White House where he planted flowers in the Rose Garden for President George H. W. Bush.

Drug running
Sharp became despondent from financial problems with his flower business and was subsequently approached by Mexican laborers at his Michigan farm who solicited him into transporting narcotics for the Sinaloa Drug Cartel in Mexico. Sharp’s success in eluding the detection of law enforcement for over ten years while transporting thousands of pounds of cocaine catapulted him into urban legend among drug traffickers who knew of his exploits.

The cartel also used Sharp to transport drug proceeds in excess of two million dollars per return trip from Michigan to Arizona in the same pickup truck.

His arrest was captured on the dashboard camera of the Michigan State Police cruiser and published in the New York Times.

The criminal investigation was prosecuted by Assistant United States Attorney Chris Graveline in the Eastern District of Michigan, culminating with indictments of 25 members of the organization, including Sharp.

Sharp was allowed to speak at his sentencing hearing before Judge Edmunds. He addressed the judge, "I’m really heartbroken I did what I did, but it’s done." In an effort to avoid prison, Sharp made a plea: instead of a custodial sentence he proposed paying the $500,000 penalty he owed the government by growing Hawaiian papayas. "It’s so sweet and delicious," he told the court. The court declined the offer and sentenced Sharp to three years in prison. His defense stated that Sharp had dementia, and would do poorly in prison. Sharp was released in 2015  due to declining health after only serving a year in prison.

Death
Sharp died of natural causes on December 12, 2016, in Michigan at the age of 92. He is buried at the National Memorial Cemetery of the Pacific in Honolulu.

In popular culture
The 2018 film The Mule is based on Sharp's life, with Clint Eastwood playing "Earl Stone" (based on Sharp) and Bradley Cooper playing "Colin Bates" (based on DEA agent Jeff Moore).

References

1924 births
2016 deaths
21st-century American criminals
American drug traffickers
United States Army personnel of World War II
Criminals from Indiana
Gangsters from Detroit
People from Michigan City, Indiana
People of the Mexican Drug War
Sinaloa Cartel traffickers
Burials in the National Memorial Cemetery of the Pacific
American horticulturists